Lorenza Samuel Nathaniel Cobb (February 10, 1888 – January 21, 1953) was an American baseball catcher in the Negro leagues. He played from 1914 to 1920, playing mostly with the St. Louis Giants. After his playing career, he became secretary of the Negro National League. He served in the 804th Pioneer Infantry during World War I.

References

External links
 and Baseball-Reference Black Baseball stats and Seamheads

1888 births
1953 deaths
Indianapolis ABCs players
St. Louis Giants players
United States Army personnel of World War I
People from Hernando, Mississippi
African Americans in World War I
20th-century African-American sportspeople
Baseball catchers
African-American United States Army personnel